Collimonas arenae is a bacterium of the genus Collimonas in the Oxalobacteraceae family which  was isolated from seminatural grassland soils on Wadden Island near Terschelling.

References

External links
Type strain of Collimonas arenae at BacDive -  the Bacterial Diversity Metadatabase

Burkholderiales
Bacteria described in 2004